On December 14 and 15 of 2013, the Sport Jiu-Jitsu International Federation (SJJIF) hosted their first ever world championship at the Walter Pyramid in Long Beach, California, with over 1800 competitors from around the world and two full days of tournament. In 2014, NABJJ had over 2200 competitors and 3 days. 

All SJJIF events feature divisions in Gi and No Gi for children through seniors.  There are no advantages and no referee decision, the SJJIF only works with points.

Male Gi Adult

Male NO Gi Adult

Male Gi Master 30

Male No Gi Master 30

Male Gi Master 36

Male No GI Master 36

Male GI Master 41

Male No GI Master 41

Male GI Master 46

Male No GI Master 46

Male GI Master 51

Male No GI Master 51

Male GI Master 56

Male No GI Master 56

Male GI Master 60

Male No Gi Master 60

Female Gi Adult

Female No Gi Adult

Female Gi Master 30

Female No Gi Master 30

References

 Site oficial SJJIF
 SJJIF Tournaments

SJJIF Worlds Gi and NoGi Tournament
No-Gi Brazilian jiu-jitsu competitions